The first edition of the Copa América de Ciclismo was held on Sunday 7 January 2001 in São Paulo, Brazil.

Results

References 
 dewielersite

Copa América de Ciclismo
Copa
Copa
January 2001 sports events in South America